John Kiely may refer to:

John Kiely (baseball) (born 1964), American former Major League Baseball pitcher
John Kiely (ice hockey) (born 1952), American former professional ice hockey goaltender
John Kiely (Limerick hurler) (born 1972), Irish hurling manager, hurler and Gaelic footballer
John Kiely (Waterford hurler) (1927–2004), Irish sportsperson